Aichi Type 2 may refer to:
Aichi Navy Type 2 Single-seat Reconnaissance Seaplane
Aichi Navy Type 2 Two-seat Reconnaissance Seaplane
Aichi Navy Type 2 Anti-Submarine and Training Flying Boat
Aichi Navy Type 2 Transport